Cajeme is one of the 72 municipalities  of the northwestern state of Sonora, Mexico. It is named after Cajemé, a Yaqui leader. The municipality has an area of 3,312.05 km2 (1,278.79 sq mi) and with a population of 436,484 inhabitants as of 2020.

History
Yaqui tribes settled in the region at approximately 1100 and in 1533 had the first contact with the Spanish conquistadors, when Diego de Guzmán arrived at the Yaqui region. The Yaquis defeated the Spanish army. In the 17th century Jesuit missionaries visited the zone to evangelize the Yaqui natives in 1617. In 1619, one of the missionaries, Martín Burgencio founded the villa of Buenavista and later the villa of Cumuripa. In 1715 El Realito was founded, which is located in the northern region of the current municipio). In the 19th century agriculture developed at the villas of Cumuripa, Buenavista and Cócorit.

Buenavista was the site for the military base of San Carlos de Buenavista during the Spanish colony. It was considered the capital of the Villa de Salvación since 1820 and in the second half of the 19th century it was considered part of the Guaymas district, as well as part of the Yaqui pueblos.

The first inhabitants of Ciudad Obregón established at the Plano Oriente neighborhood when irrigation systems by the Richardson company started functioning in 1910. The train Sudpacífico established a station they called Cajeme. Cajeme then was a part of the municipio of Cócorit until it became the capital of the municipio on November 29, 1927. On July 28, 1928, Ciudad Obregón was declared as name for the town previously known as Cajeme and that it would become the capital of the municipio of Cajeme. Previously Cócorit had been dependent on the district of Buenavista during the independent period. According to a law from 1828 for the indigenous governments it was established as a capital of one of their government divisions. On December 26, 1930 it was annexed to the Cajeme municipality.

Important towns
Ciudad Obregón 
Cócorit
Esperanza
Marte R. Gómez (Tobarito)
Providencia
Pueblo Yaqui

Government

Municipal presidents

See also
Municipalities of Sonora
Cajemé- Yaqui Leader, born 1837, died 1887.

References

Sources
Link to tables of population data from Census of 2005 INEGI: Instituto Nacional de Estadística, Geografía e Informática
Sonora Enciclopedia de los Municipios de México

External links
 Sitio Oficial de Cajeme Official website
 History of Cajeme at the site of the tourism office of the state of Sonora.
History of Cajeme at the official site of the municipio.
 Noticias, fotos, videos, clasificados, empresas y eventos en Ciudad Obregón
 OCV Ciudad Obregón Official Convention and Visitors Bureau]

Municipalities of Sonora